The Gitsegukla Indian Band  (formerly Kitsegukla) are a First Nation based at the community of Gitsegukla (formerly Skeena Crossing) near the meeting of the Skeena and Gitsegukla River in northwestern B.C.

Chief and Councillors
The Chief and Councillors listed below were elected in 2021, for a term that will end in 2024:

Chief:  Ann Howard

Councilors:   Wendy Wesley, Brian Wesley Sr., Julia Walker, Crystal Smith, Thelma Marsden, Jennifer Gladstone-Howard, Mel Aksidan, Randy Russell

Treaty Process

History

Demographics
INAC number, 535 the Gitsegukla Indian Band has 914 members.

Economic Development

Social, Educational and Cultural Programs and Facilities

References

Skeena Country
Gitxsan governments